FC 's-Gravenzande is a football club from 's-Gravenzande, Netherlands. FC 's-Gravenzande plays in the 2021–22 Saturday Hoofdklasse A.

References

External links
 Official site

Football clubs in the Netherlands
Football clubs in South Holland
Sport in Westland (municipality), Netherlands
Association football clubs established in 2010
2010 establishments in the Netherlands